Ode to the Death of Jazz is an album by  Finnish avant-garde jazz composer, bandleader and drummer Edward Vesala recorded in 1989 and released on the ECM label in 1990.

Reception
The Allmusic review by Brian Olewnick awarded the album 2½ stars stating "it feels as though something essential is being restrained, as though Vesala is reluctant to simply let his ensemble surge forward unbound. Fine instrumental work abounds, however, notably by the leader himself on drums and the Garbarek-laden tones of tenor saxophonist Jouni Kannisto. In sum, the listener gets the impression that, although all the elements are in place for a fine album, excessive control has led to a dilution of the power that could have been".

Track listing
All compositions by Edward Vesala
 "Sylvan Swizzle" - 8:34   
 "Infinite Express" - 7:54   
 "Time to Think" - 7:34   
 "Winds of Sahara" - 4:19   
 "Watching for the Signal" - 8:13   
 "A Glimmer of Sepal" - 5:26   
 "Mop Mop" - 5:37   
 "What? Where? Hum Hum" - 8:19  
Recorded at Sound and Fury Studio in Helsinki, Finland in April and May 1989

Personnel
Edward Vesala - drums, percussion
Matti Riikonen - trumpet
Jorma Tapio - alto saxophone, bass clarinet, flute
Jouni Kannisto - tenor saxophone, flute
Pepa Päivinen - soprano saxophone, tenor saxophone, baritone saxophone, flute, bass clarinet
Tim Ferchen - marimba, tubular bells
Taito Vainio - accordion
Iro Haarla - piano, harp, keyboards
Jimi Sumén - guitar
Uffe Krokfors - bass

References

ECM Records albums
Edward Vesala albums
1990 albums
Albums produced by Manfred Eicher
Death in music